Naser Albokat is an Iranian footballer who plays for Sanat Naft Abadan F.C. in the IPL.

References

Living people
Sanat Naft Abadan F.C. players
Iranian footballers
Association football midfielders
Year of birth missing (living people)